Let's Face the Music! is a 1964 studio album by Nat King Cole, arranged by Billy May. It was recorded in November 1961, and released three years later.

The initial Billboard review from February 29, 1964 commented that "The fine blend of Cole singing is beautifully melded with the smart, witty and swinging backing supplied by Billy May...The tempos are mostly in that grand, finger-poppin middle tempo that is just May's cup of tea'".

Track listing
 "Day In, Day Out" (Rube Bloom, Johnny Mercer) – 2:25
 "Bidin' My Time" (George Gershwin, Ira Gershwin) – 2:27
 "When My Sugar Walks Down the Street" (Gene Austin, Jimmy McHugh, Irving Mills) – 2:10
 "Warm and Willing" (Ray Evans, Jay Livingston, McHugh) – 3:01 **
 "I'm Gonna Sit Right Down and Write Myself a Letter" (Fred E. Ahlert, Joe Young) – 2:37
 "Cold, Cold Heart" (Hank Williams) – 3:45 **
 "Something Makes Me Want to Dance with You" (Colin Romoff, Danny Meehan) – 2:09
 "Moon Love" (Mack David, André Kostelanetz) – 2:11 **
 "The Rules of the Road" (Cy Coleman, Carolyn Leigh) – 2:45
 "Ebony Rhapsody" (Sam Coslow, Arthur Johnston) – 3:04
 "Too Little, Too Late" (Arthur Kent, Jerry Grant) – 2:59
 "Let's Face the Music and Dance" (Irving Berlin) – 2:25

Personnel
 Nat King Cole – vocal, hammond organ
 Billy May – arranger, conductor
 Jimmy Rowles - piano
 **Heinie Beau – arranger

Orchestra Members
 Harps: Verlye Mills (1, 3, 5-7, 10-12), Kathryn Julye (2, 4, 8-9)
 Trumpets: Frank Beach (1, 3, 10-11), Vito Mangano (2, 4, 8-9), Uan Rasey (5-7, 12), John Best, Conrad Gozzo, Reunald Jones
 Trombones: Murray McEachern (1, 3, 10-11), Tommy Shepard (1-4, 8-11), Milt Bernhart (5-7, 12), Tommy Pederson (2, 4, 8-9), Ed Kusby (2, 4-9, 12), Lloyd Ullate (1, 3, 5-7, 10-12), Bill Schaefer
 Tuba: Red Callender
 Alto Saxophones: Gene Cipriano (1, 3, 10-11), Harry Klee (2, 4-9, 12), Willie Schwartz (1, 3, 5-7, 10-12)
 Tenor Saxophones: Buddy Collette (2, 4-9, 12), Ted Nash (1-4, 8-11), Plas Johnson
 Baritone Saxophone: Chuck Gentry
 Violins: Israel Baker (5-7, 12), Victor Arno (2, 4, 8-9), Emil Briano (5-7, 12), Dave Frisina (2, 4, 8-9), Jack Gasselin (2, 4, 8-9), Irv Klase (5-7, 12), Joe Livoti (2, 4, 8-9), Rickey Marino (2, 4-9, 12), Emanuel Moss (2, 4-9, 12), Isadore Roman (2, 4-9, 12), Ambrose Russo (5-7, 12), Marshall Sosson (2, 4, 8-9), Jerry Vinci (2, 4, 8-9), Harry Zagon (5-7, 12)
 Violas (on 2, 4, 8-9): Virginia Majewski, Alvin Dinkin, Al Harshman, Gary Nuttycombe
 Cellos (on 2, 4, 8-9): William Van Den Burg, Joseph DiTullio, Hyman Gold, David Pratt

References

1964 albums
Nat King Cole albums
Albums arranged by Billy May
Capitol Records albums
Albums conducted by Billy May